Şorbaçı may refer to:
Şorbaçı, Hajigabul, Azerbaijan
Şorbaçı, Jalilabad, Azerbaijan
Shorbachy Vtoryye, Azerbaijan